1000 Lake Shore Plaza is a 590 ft (180m) tall skyscraper in Chicago, Illinois. It was completed in 1964 and has 55 floors. Sidney Morris designed the building, which is the 47th tallest in Chicago. When it was completed, it was claimed as the tallest reinforced concrete building in the world, but the Tour de la Bourse in Montreal was completed the same year, thus taking the title. The tower was also the tallest building in Chicago with balconies until the Park Tower was completed in 1999.

See also
List of tallest buildings in Chicago

References

Buildings and structures completed in 1964
Residential skyscrapers in Chicago
1964 establishments in Illinois